The 1967 NCAA Men's Soccer Tournament was the ninth organized men's college soccer tournament by the National Collegiate Athletic Association, to determine the top college soccer team in the United States. The Michigan State Spartans and the Saint Louis Billikens were co-national champions after the championship game was called due to inclement weather while the game was tied 0–0. This was Michigan State's first and Saint Louis' sixth title. The final match was played on December 2, 1967, in St. Louis, Missouri. The most outstanding offensive player of the tournament was Ernie Tuchscherer of Michigan State.

Teams

Bracket

References

See also
 1967 NAIA Soccer Championship

Championship
NCAA Division I Men's Soccer Tournament seasons
NCAA
NCAA Division I Men's Soccer Championship
NCAA Soccer Tournament